Nola Chilton (12 February 1922 – 8 October 2021) was an American-born Israeli theater director and acting teacher. She was a pioneer of socially engaged theater in Israel. In 2013, Chilton was awarded the Israel Prize for theater.

Biography
Nola Chilton was born in Brooklyn, New York to Jewish immigrants from Odessa. Her mother died of tuberculosis when she was twelve. Her father was a jewelry engraver and food peddler. She studied acting under Lee Strasberg and worked at the Actors Studio, coaching actors and directing. In 1960, she directed an off-off Broadway production of "Dead End," a radical play about the miserable lives of poverty-stricken young people, in which Dustin Hoffman appeared.

In 1963, Chilton immigrated to Israel, settling in Kiryat Gat, then a small town in the northern Negev. She worked briefly for the Cameri Theater but was not enamored with the Tel Aviv scene, which reminded her of what she had left behind. She adopted a two-year-old girl and moved to the north of the country, first to Kibbutz Ma'agan Michael and then Kibbutz Yasur. She was married to author John Auerbach, who died in 2002. Chilton was latterly a resident of Kibbutz Sdot Yam. She died on 8 October 2021, at the age of 99.

Legacy and influence
Chilton was the inspiration for The Open Theater, an experimental theatre group active from 1963 to 1973 in New York City founded by her students to implement her "post-method," post-absurd acting technique through a collaborative process that explores political, artistic, and social issues.

References

1922 births
2021 deaths
People from Brooklyn
American emigrants to Israel
Israel Prize in theatre recipients
Israel Prize women recipients
Israeli theatre directors
American people of Ukrainian-Jewish descent
Israeli people of Ukrainian-Jewish descent